Schiffermuelleria is a genus of gelechioid moths. It is placed in the subfamily Oecophorinae of family Oecophoridae. The genus is treated as monotypic, with the single species Schiffermuelleria schaefferella placed here. As such, its distinctness from the closely related genus Borkhausenia – where S. schaefferella was often placed in the past – is open to debate.

Earlier authors, by contrast, included many other species of Borkhausenia here, as well as some species nowadays placed in Denisia. Today, if anything Schiffermuellerina (established only in 1989) is included in Schiffermuelleria as a subgenus. But although they are certainly similar at a casual glance, the placement of Schiffermuellerina among the Oecophoridae is not yet resolved in sufficient detail, and it may well be more distinct. 

The caterpillars of this moth develop in rotting wood, on which they feed.

Footnotes

References
 Fauna Europaea (FE) (2009): Schiffermuelleria. Version 2.1, 2009-DEC-22. Retrieved 2010-APR-28.
 Grabe, Albert (1942): Eigenartige Geschmacksrichtungen bei Kleinschmetterlingsraupen ["Strange tastes among micromoth caterpillars"]. Zeitschrift des Wiener Entomologen-Vereins 27: 105-109 [in German]. PDF fulltext
 Pitkin, Brian & Jenkins, Paul (2004a): Butterflies and Moths of the World, Generic Names and their Type-species – Schiffermuelleria. Version of 2004-NOV-05. Retrieved 2010-APR-28.
 Pitkin, Brian & Jenkins, Paul (2004a): Butterflies and Moths of the World, Generic Names and their Type-species – Schiffermuellerina. Version of 2004-NOV-05. Retrieved 2010-APR-28.
 Savela, Markku (2001): Markku Savela's Lepidoptera and some other life forms – Schiffermuelleria. Version of 2001-NOV-07. Retrieved 2010-APR-28.

Oecophorinae
Monotypic moth genera
Moths of Europe
Moths of Asia
Moths described in 1758
Taxa named by Carl Linnaeus